John J. Cali (August 8, 1918 – February 1, 2014) was an American real estate developer, philanthropist, and musician.

Biography
Cali was born in Tercio, Colorado in Las Animas County, a coal mining town and raised in Passaic, New Jersey, the son of an Italian immigrant miner. He graduated from Clifton High School. He worked his way through college by playing saxophone and clarinet in jazz and swing bands eventually graduating from Indiana University with a B.A. in sociology and psychology. After school he worked for the Western Electric Company and in 1949, he co-founded Cali Associates with his brother, Angelo R. Cali and a friend, Edward Leshowitz. Cali initially focused on residential properties building over 5,500 housing units in New Jersey before expanding into the development of commercial buildings in 1969. In 1989, he built the International Financial Center in Jersey City. In 1994, the company went public as a real estate investment trust under the name Cali Realty Corporation, creating the first office REIT in New Jersey; he served as its chairman from 1994 until its 1997 merger with the Mack Company (founded by H. Bert Mack and then operated by his four sons Fredric H. Mack, David S. Mack, Earle I. Mack, and William L. Mack) creating Mack-Cali Realty Corporation, the largest office-property owner in New Jersey. He retired in 2000. Cali also was a co-founder of Cali Futures, which focuses on real estate investment projects in New Jersey.

Philanthropy and awards
In 2008, Cali donated $5 million to Montclair State University to fund a school of music known as the John J. Cali School of Music. Cali served as president of the Office Developers Association of New Jersey. In 1996, he received the Ellis Island Medal of Honor.

Personal life
Cali was married three times. His first marriage ended in divorce. His second marriage ended in 1973 after his wife, Renee, and his stepdaughter, Leslie Grant, were murdered in the basement of the family's home in Upper Montclair, New Jersey. The family's "window washer who had been occasionally employed by the Calis was later convicted in the murders." His third marriage was to fellow Montclair State alumni Rose C. Cali. He has five children: Brant Cali, Jonna Cali, Christopher Cali, Michael Nevins, and Joshua Nevins.

References

1918 births
2014 deaths
American people of Italian descent
American real estate businesspeople
Clifton High School (New Jersey) alumni
Indiana University alumni
People from Las Animas County, Colorado
People from Clifton, New Jersey
People from Montclair, New Jersey
People from Passaic, New Jersey